John Watson (died 1870) was a nineteenth-century African-American politician from Virginia.

Early life
Watson was born a slave in Mecklenburg County, Virginia.

Career

As an adult following the American Civil War, Watson spent the five years of his life as a freedman promoting African-American schools and churches in Mecklenburg.

In 1867, Watson was elected to the Virginia Constitutional Convention of 1868. A Republican, he was the sole delegate elected from the central Piedmont convention district made up of his home Mecklenburg County.

Following the Convention, Robinson was subsequently elected to the Virginia House of Delegates for the session 1869/70.

Death
John Watson died in 1870 before the end of his term in office. He was succeeded by Ross Hamilton.

References

Bibliography

Republican Party members of the Virginia House of Delegates
Year of birth missing
1870 deaths
People from Mecklenburg County, Virginia
African-American state legislators in Virginia